Joseph Nassise (born 1968) is a New York Times and USA Today bestselling American urban fantasy writer and the author of more than sixty novels. His debut novel, Riverwatch, was nominated for both the Bram Stoker Award and the International Horror Guild Award. He is the author of the internationally bestselling Templar Chronicles series, the Jeremiah Hunt Chronicle, the Great Undead War series, as well as several books for Gold Eagle's Rogue Angel line. His work has been translated into German, Russian, Polish Portuguese, Spanish, and Italian. Nassise served as the president of the Horror Writers Association from 2002 to 2005 and a Trustee of the same from 2008 to 2010.

Nassise was born and raised in Easton, Massachusetts. He lives with his wife and four children in Arizona.

Bibliography

Novels
Riverwatch (Pocket Books, 2003) Bram Stoker Award and International Horror Guild Award nominee

Series
The Templar Chronicles
Novels
Heretic (Pocket Books, 2005), later retitled as The Heretic
A Scream of Angels (Harbinger Books, 2010), first published in German translation as Der Engel (Droemer Knaur, 2007)
A Tear in the Sky (Harbinger Books, 2010), first published in German translation as Die Schatten (Droemer Knaur, 2008)
Infernal Games (Harbinger Books, 2014)
Judgment Day (Harbinger Books, 2014)
Fall of Night (Harbinger Books, 2017)
Darkness Reigns (Harbinger Books, 2018)
Nephilim Rising (Harbinger Books, 2019)
Templar Chronicles Mission novellas
Shades of Blood and Darkness (Harbinger Books, 2014), set before The Heretic, previously published in slightly different form as That Cleansing Fire
The Hungry Dark (Harbinger Books, 2014), set between The Heretic and A Scream of Angels, also contained in SNAFU: Heroes: An Anthology of Military Horror
Tooth and Claw (Harbinger Books, 2018)Flesh and Bone (Harbinger Books, 2018)
The Jeremiah Hunt Chronicle
Eyes to See (Tor Books, 2011), first published in German translation as Der Schattenseher (PAN, 2009)
King of the Dead (Tor Books, 2012)
Watcher of the Dark (Tor Books, 2013)
The Great Undead War
By the Blood of Heroes (HarperVoyager, 2012)
On Her Majesty's Behalf (HarperVoyager, 2014)
The Sharp End (Harbinger Books, 2014), short story set before By the Blood of Heroes
The Aspect Cycle (with Steven Savile using the pen name Matthew Caine)
Ghosts of the Conquered (2015)
The Swords of Scorn (scheduled for Oct 2015)
Rogue Angel
The Spirit Banner (Gold Eagle/Worldwide Library, 2010)
The Dragon's Mark (Gold Eagle/Worldwide Library, 2010)
Tear of the Gods (Gold Eagle/Worldwide Library, 2011)
Cradle of Solitude (Gold Eagle/Worldwide Library, 2012)
Library of Gold (Gold Eagle/Worldwide Library, 2012)
Staff of Judea (Gold Eagle/Worldwide Library, 2013)
The Vanishing Tribe (Gold Eagle/Worldwide Library, 2013)
Treasure of Lima (Gold Eagle/Worldwide Library, 2014)
Bathed in Blood (Gold Eagle/Worldwide Library, 2015)
Beneath Still Waters (Gold Eagle/Worldwide Library, 2015)
HELLstakers
The Cerberus Protocol (Harbinger Books, 2002) (with Jon F. Merz)

Novellas and collections
More Than Life Itself (Telos Publishing, 2006), novella also contained in Shades of Reality
Spectres and Darkness (Medium Rare Books, 2002), collection containing eleven pieces of short fiction: five stories by Nassise and six by Drew Williams
Shades of Reality: Tales of Horror and Dark Fantasy (Harbinger Books, 2011), collection of twelve pieces of short fiction including More Than Life Itself

Comics
Heretic (Markosia Comics, United Kingdom, 2006) - 6 issue mini-series,
Candice Crowe (Arcana Studios, 2011) - Original Graphic Novel

Edited anthologies
Brimstone Dreams (Harbinger Books, 2011)
Midian Unmade: Tales of Clive Barker's Nightbreed (Tor Books, 2015) (with Del Howison)
Urban Allies (HarperVoyager, 2016)
Urban Enemies (Gallery, 2017)

Role-playing game supplements
The Sentinel's Bible (Creative Illusions, 2003) - players sourcebook for The Seventh Seal role-playing game

Interviews
Voices of Horror #10: An Interview with Joseph Nassise

External links
Joseph Nassise's Official Website
The Templar Chronicles Website

See also
List of horror fiction authors

21st-century American novelists
American horror writers
American male novelists
Living people
1968 births
People from Easton, Massachusetts
21st-century American male writers